Baldwin (I) from the kindred Rátót (died after 1255) was a Hungarian distinguished nobleman from the gens Rátót, who served as master of the cupbearers three times. His father was Rathold Rátót, ispán (comes) of Somogy County in 1203. His older brother was Dominic I Rátót.

He served as master of the cupbearers between 1233 and 1234. After that he functioned as ispán of Moson County in 1235. He was appointed master of the cupbearers for the second time in 1235, a position which he held until 1238. He was ispán of Vas County from 1240 to 1244. After that he functioned as ispán of Nyitra County in 1244. He served as master of the cupbearers for the third time between 1247 and 1254, besides that he held the office of ispán of Bánya from 1247 to 1251. He finished his career as ispán of Vas County in 1255.

References

Sources
  Zsoldos, Attila (2011). Magyarország világi archontológiája, 1000–1301 ("Secular Archontology of Hungary, 1000–1301"). História, MTA Történettudományi Intézete. Budapest. 

Baldwin I
13th-century Hungarian people
Masters of the cupbearers